Cardinali may refer to:
 a ready-to-wear clothing brand name launched by Marilyn, the wife of Harry Lewis in the 1960s
 Julieta Cardinali (born 1977), an Argentine film and television actress
 Michael Cardinali (born 1990), Italian professional football player
 Sonia Haoa Cardinali (born 1953), Rapanui archaeologist
 Terzilio Cardinali (1913–1944), Italian soldier

See also
 Cardinale, a surname

Italian-language surnames